Clystea aner is a moth of the subfamily Arctiinae. It was described by George Hampson in 1905. It is found in Venezuela.

References

Clystea
Moths described in 1905